Badarash is a village in Dohuk Governorate in Kurdistan Region, Iraq. It is located in the Sapna valley in the district of Amadiya.

In the village, there is a Chaldean Catholic church of Mar Gewargis.

History
After the Assyrian genocide in the First World War, Badarash was settled by Assyrian refugees of the Baz clan from modern-day Turkey in the 1920s, all of whom belonged either to the Church of the East or the Chaldean Catholic Church. The church of Mar Gewargis was constructed in 1925, and by 1938, 152 people inhabited the village, with 27 families. Badarash was destroyed and its population expelled by the Iraqi government at the onset of the First Iraqi–Kurdish War in 1961, prior to which the village had 30 houses. Villagers later returned, but Badarash was destroyed again during the Al-Anfal campaign in 1987.

The village was rebuilt again, and the population of the village reached 40 families by 2004. Violence against Assyrians in urban centres of Iraq led 102 displaced Assyrians, with 27 families, to seek refuge in Badarash by early 2009. By 2012 the Supreme Committee of Christian Affairs had constructed 48 houses and a community hall. Humanitarian aid was delivered to Badarash by the Assyrian Aid Society in May 2015. The village's graveyard was renovated by the French non-governmental organisation SOS Chrétiens d'Orient in 2018.

Gallery

References
Notes

Citations

Bibliography

 
 
 

Populated places in Dohuk Province
Assyrian communities in Iraq
Populated places established in the 1920s
1920s establishments in Iraq